Dubovsky District is an administrative district (raion), one of the thirty-three in Volgograd Oblast, Russia. As a municipal division, it is incorporated as Dubovsky Municipal District. It is located in the center of the oblast. Its administrative center is the town of Dubovka. Population:  31,186 (2002 Census);  The population of Dubovka accounts for 47.7% of the district's total population.

References

Notes

Sources

Districts of Volgograd Oblast